Ancistrosyrinx clytotropis is a species of sea snail, a marine gastropod mollusk in the family Cochlespiridae.

Description
The length of the shell attains 8 mm, its diameter 4 mm.

(Original description) The elongate shell has a fusiform shape. It is pale brownish white (dead). The spire is well produced and contains five angulated and convex whorls. The protoconch consists of two whorls, large, glassy, and bulbous, smooth save for indistinct traces of microscopic spirals. The remaining whorls are strongly, angulated and carinated at the periphery. This carina appears on the later whorls as if duplex ; below this carina is a second, smaller one, and two more are obscurely indicated below. The aperture is strongly angled, and the siphonal canal is spout-like and slightly twisted.

Distribution
This species occurs in European waters, found at Vigo Bay, off Cape Mondego at a depth of 1980 m.

References

 Gofas, S.; Le Renard, J.; Bouchet, P. (2001). Mollusca, in: Costello, M.J. et al. (Ed.) (2001). European register of marine species: a check-list of the marine species in Europe and a bibliography of guides to their identification. Collection Patrimoines Naturels, 50: pp. 180–213
 Tucker, J.K. 2004 Catalog of recent and fossil turrids (Mollusca: Gastropoda). Zootaxa 682:1-1295.

External links

clytotropis